The 1947–48 Connecticut Huskies men's basketball team represented the University of Connecticut in the 1947–48 collegiate men's basketball season. The Huskies completed the season with a 17–6 overall record. The Huskies were members of the Yankee Conference, where they ended the season with a 6–1 record. The Huskies played their home games at Hawley Armory in Storrs, Connecticut, and were led by second-year head coach Hugh Greer.

Schedule 

|-
!colspan=12 style=""| Regular Season

Schedule Source:

References 

UConn Huskies men's basketball seasons
Connecticut
1947 in sports in Connecticut
1948 in sports in Connecticut